is a junction railway station located in the city of Ise, Mie Prefecture, Japan, operated by the private operator Kintetsu. It is the closest station to Ise Grand Shrine and thus has an important role for tourists and pilgrims. The station also administrates the section between Kushida Station and Isuzugawa Station.

Lines
Ujiyamada Station is served by the Kintetsu Yamada Line and the Toba Line. It is 28.3 rail kilometers from the terminus of both lines at Ise-Nakagawa Station.

Station layout

Ujiyamada Station has 2 through platforms and two bay platforms, a total of four. The platforms are on the third floor of the station building. The only entrance to the building is on the west of the first floor. A royal suite is located in the second floor. Originally a penthouse on the building's east end, it was used as a fire watch tower, and became the firefighting headquarters of postwar Ise.

Platforms

History
Ujiyamada Station was opened as the terminal station of the Sangu Kyuko Electric Railway on March 17, 1931. On March 15, 1941, the line merged with Osaka Electric Railway to become a station on Kansai Kyuko Railway's Yamada Line. This line in turn was merged with the Nankai Electric Railway on June 1, 1944 to form Kintetsu. Services to Nagoya began on January 20, 1920, and the line was extended from Ujiyamada to Isuzugawa Station on December 15, 1969. In 2001, the station building was named a Registered Registered Tangible Cultural Properties by the national government.

Passenger statistics
In fiscal 2019, the station was used by an average of 5484 passengers daily (boarding passengers only).

Surrounding area
Ise Grand Shrine
Chokokan Ise Grand Shrine History Museum 
Ise City Hall
Ise sight-seeing information center
Kōgakkan University
Kōgakkan High School
Ise High School
Ise Technical High School

Gallery

See also
List of railway stations in Japan

References

External links

 Kintetsu: Layout of Ujiyamada Station 
 Kintetsu: Ujiyamada Station 
 Ujiyamada Station page on Cultural Properties of Mie Prefecture 

Railway stations in Japan opened in 1931
Railway stations in Mie Prefecture
Stations of Kintetsu Railway
Ise, Mie
Registered Tangible Cultural Properties